SK Hanácká Slavia Kroměříž is a football club located in Kroměříž, Czech Republic. It currently plays in the Moravian–Silesian Football League, which is the third tier of Czech football.

In the 2004–2005 and 2005–2006 seasons, the club played in the Czech 2. Liga.

Historical names 

 1919 – SK Hanácká Slavia Kroměříž (Sportovní klub Hanácká Slavia Kroměříž)
 1941 – merger with SK Hanácká Sparta Kroměříž => name unchanged
 1953 – DSO Spartak Kroměříž (Dobrovolná sportovní organisace Spartak Kroměříž)
 1958 – TJ Slavia Kroměříž (Tělovýchovná jednota Slavia Kroměříž)
 1991 – SK Hanácká Slavia Kroměříž (Sportovní klub Hanácká Slavia Kroměříž)

Czech Cup
While still playing at the third level of national competition, the club reached the semi-finals of the 2010–11 Czech Cup.

Previous seasons
 2003–04: MSFL  1st
 2004–05: 2.Liga 13th
 2005–06: 2.Liga 8th
 2006–07: Divize E 1st
 2007–08: MSFL  12th
 2008–09: MSFL  5th
 2009–10: MSFL  10th
 2010–11: MSFL  4th
 2011–12: MSFL  15th
 2012–13: MSFL  13th
 2013–14: MSFL  14th
 2014–15: MSFL  2nd
 2015–16: MSFL  7th
 2016–17: MSFL  4th
 2017–18: MSFL  4th
 2018–19: MSFL  4th

Honours
Moravian–Silesian Football League (third tier)
 Champions 2003–04

References

External links
 Official website 
 Club page at iDNES.cz 

Football clubs in the Czech Republic
Association football clubs established in 1919
Kroměříž